Kiwere is an administrative ward in the Iringa Rural district of the Iringa Region of Tanzania. In 2016 the Tanzania National Bureau of Statistics report there were 10,229 people in the ward, from 9,776 in 2012.

Villages / vitongoji 
The ward has 5 villages and 21 vitongoji.

 Kiwere
 Chapakazi
 Makondo
 Mwaya A
 Mwaya B
 Mgera
 Kidete
 Luganga
 Mapinduzi
 Mlangali
 Itagutwa
 Itagutwa
 Kipengele
 Mapululu
 Mlenge
 Kitapilimwa
 Ikingo
 Kinyamaduma
 Lugalo
 Mfyome
 Malamba A
 Malamba B
 Matembo
 Mgega
 Mhefu
 Msosa

References 

Wards of Iringa Region